The Breakfast (Le Petit Déjeuner) is a painting by Juan Gris, painted in October 1915. It is in the collection of the Musée National d'Art Moderne, in Paris, purchased in 1947.

Description 
This cubist canvas is executed in oil and charcoal. It is a still life depicting a coffee grinder, a coffee pot and a fruit bowl .

History
From 2018 to 2019, it was in the exhibition, Le Cubisme, at the Centre Pompidou, Paris.

References

1915 paintings
Paintings by Juan Gris
Cubist paintings
Still life paintings
Paintings in the collection of the Musée National d'Art Moderne